A hamun (or hamoun) ( hāmūn) refers to inland desert lakes or marshlands, formed as natural seasonal reservoirs in areas adjoining the Helmand basin, found across eastern Iran, southern Afghanistan and western Pakistan.  They form a critical link in the wildlife of the area, aquatic as well as avian and terrestrial.

The better-known hamuns include:
Hamun-e Helmand, Afghanistan and Iran
Hamun Lake, Iran and Afghanistan 
Hamun-e Jaz Murian, Iran 
Hamun-e Mashkel or Mashkid, Balochistan mainly in Pakistan and border.
Hamun-e Puzak, Afghanistan   
Hamun-e Saberi in Sistan, straddling Iran-Afghanistan border
Hamun Zeheh, Goad-i Zereh or Godzareh depression, Afghanistan

References 

Geography of Central Asia
Wetlands